A resource-based or natural-resource-based economy is that of a country whose gross national product or gross domestic product to a large extent comes from natural resources.

Examples
The economies of Gulf Cooperation Council (GCC) countries like Saudi Arabia, Kuwait and Qatar are highly dependent on exporting oil and gas.

Suriname's exports of bauxite account for more than 15% of GDP and 70% of export earnings.

Of Russian exports, more than 80% are oil, natural gas, metals and timber. Since Russia has a resource-based economy, it depends most of all on the fluctuations of oil and gas demand and prices.

Norway's export of oil and gas forms 45% of total exports and more than 20% of the GDP.

See also
 Natural resource economics

References

Bibliography
 Barry C.Field (2000), Natural Resource Economics, McGraw-Hill. .
 Thomas H. Tietenberg (1988), Environmental and Natural Resource Economics, Scott-Foresman. .
 Philip A. Neher (1990), Natural Resource Economics: Conservation and Exploitation, Cambridge University Press. .
 Steven C. Hackett (2001), Environmental and Natural Resources Economics: Theory, Policy, and the Sustainable Society, M.E. Sharpe. .
 Erhun Kula (1992), Economics of Natural Resources and the Environment, Springer. .
 Juan C. Suris Regueiro, Manuel M. Varela Lafuente (1995), Introducción a la economía de los recursos naturales, Civitas. .
 Pere Riera (2005), Manual de economía ambiental y de los recursos naturales, Thomson. .
 Carlos Romero (1994), Economía de los recursos ambientales y naturales, Alianza Editorial. .
 Alan Randall, Ricardo Calvet Perez (1985), Economía de los recursos naturales y política ambiental, Limusa. .
 Roxana Barrantes (1997), Hacia un nuevo dorado: Economía de los recursos naturales, Consorcio de Investigación Económica. .

External links
 "How to Sustain Growth in a Resource Based Economy? The Main Concepts and their Application to the Russian Case" (United Nations Economic Commission for Europe)

Resource economics